The South Dakota Dept. of Transportation Bridge No. 30-257-400 is a historic bridge in rural Hand County, South Dakota. The bridge is a single-span steel beam stringer bridge, resting on I-beam pile abutments with concrete wings. Built in 1917, it was one of the first bridges built in the county by county employees, rather than by hired bridge companies, and predates the formation of state highway department by two years.

The bridge was listed on the National Register of Historic Places in 1993.

See also
National Register of Historic Places listings in Hand County, South Dakota
List of bridges on the National Register of Historic Places in South Dakota

References

Road bridges on the National Register of Historic Places in South Dakota
Bridges completed in 1917
Buildings and structures in Hand County, South Dakota
National Register of Historic Places in Hand County, South Dakota
1917 establishments in South Dakota
Steel bridges in the United States